Shadow Star is the third  book in the Chronicles of the Shadow War trilogy.

Shadow Star is preceded by Shadow Moon in 1995, and Shadow Dawn in 1996. It was written by Chris Claremont in collaboration with George Lucas. Published in 2000, it was the third book in the continuation of events from the 1988 motion picture Willow.

Plot
Elora Danan has slain the dragons who embodied the soul of Creation, preventing the Deceiver from using them to rule the Realms. While attempting to heal Khory from the wound inflicted during their fight with the Deceiver, Elora is transported to a vision of the warrior's past, where she learns from Calan Dineer that Khory attempted to save his race during an ancient war. Elora, Thorn and Khory bind themselves to the last two dragon eggs with a spell which renders they, and they alone, capable of using them.

References

2000 American novels
Books by Chris Claremont
English-language novels
American fantasy novels
Willow (film)
Bantam Spectra books